Depressaria lacticapitella is a moth of the family Depressariidae. It is found in Austria.

The wingspan is 22–24 mm.

The larvae feed on Athamanta cretensis.

References

External links
lepiforum.de

Moths described in 1942
Depressaria
Moths of Europe